Dilwala is a 2013 romantic drama Kannada film directed by Anil Kumar (Dilwala Anil). The film stars Sumanth Shailendra and Radhika Pandit. Shailendra Babu is producing this film which is backed with Arjun Janya's music and Sudhakar's cinematography.

Shot at the scenic locales of Bangalore, Mysore, Ooty and Dubai for two songs, the film speaks about a campus romance between a village farmer girl and a rich brat boy. The film received average response from the critics and performed above average at the box-office with the first weekend collections of up to 3.7crores.

Cast
 Sumanth Shailendra as Prem
 Radhika Pandit as Preethi
 Ravishankar
 Jai Jagadish
 Sharath Lohitashwa
 Bullet Prakash

Production
After the debacle of his debut film Aata (2011), actor Sumanth Shailendra with the help of his producer father Shailendra Babu teamed up with director - writer Anil Kumar for a romantic entertainer. The producer signed on the talented actress Radhika Pandit to play the female lead. Arjun Janya was roped in to compose the music while Anil Kumar's previous associate Sudhakar was made to handle the cinematography.

The first schedule of the filming began on 16 December 2012 and continued for a week including a scene at Hyderabad outdoor spot. Rest of the filming took place in Ooty, Mysore, Bangalore and the team left for Dubai to shoot two songs. A huge set was erected on the streets of NICE road near Bangalore spending about 30Lakhs. The film released at around 100 cinema halls across Karnataka.

Soundtrack
The music for the film is composed by Arjun Janya. The lyrics for the songs were written by director Anil Kumar himself along with Yogaraj Bhat and Ananda Priya.

Track list

References

External links
 Dilwala discussion at Gandhadagudi 
 Dilwala Audio review
 Sify reviews

2013 films
2010s Kannada-language films
Indian romantic drama films
Films shot in Dubai
2013 romantic drama films
Films scored by Arjun Janya
Films shot in Bangalore
Films shot in Mysore
Films shot in Ooty